Kim Røntved (born May 9, 1960 in Copenhagen), known as "the Rocket", is a Danish former professional football (soccer) player and head coach. A 17-time all-star in various leagues, and a fan favorite with the Wichita Wings, he was inducted into the Indoor Soccer Hall of Fame in February 2014.

The younger brother of Per Røntved, Kim started his career in Brønshøj BK before turning out for Randers Freja.  In 1980, the Wichita Wings of the Major Indoor Soccer League purchased Røntved's contract.  He spent seven seasons in Wichita.  In 1982, he played outdoor soccer with the Tulsa Roughnecks of the North American Soccer League.  In 1983, he played for the Dallas Americans of the American Soccer League. In 1987, financial difficulties led the Wings to release Røntved and several other veteran players.  On July 8, 1987, he signed as a free agent with the Kansas City Comets. When the Comets folded in the summer of 1991, Rontved became a free agent.  In September 1991, he signed as a player-assistant coach with the Wings. He was the 1993 NPSL Defender of the Year. On July 5, 1992, he signed with the Colorado Foxes of the American Professional Soccer League. In 1992, the Wichita Wings moved to the National Professional Soccer League.  In 1998, the Wings came under new ownership and they released Rontved, who then signed as a free agent with the Kansas City Attack.

Røntved served as the head coach of the Missouri Comets from August 16, 2010, to August 29, 2013.  In October 2014, he was named Director of Operations for the Wichita B-52s; two months later, he became head coach. On February 8, 2015, he and Missouri Comets head coach Vlatko Andonovski came out of retirement to play against each other in a regular season game.

References

External links
 MISL Greats
 NASL/MISL stats

1960 births
Living people
American Soccer League (1933–1983) players
American Professional Soccer League players
Colorado Foxes players
Dallas Americans players
Danish men's footballers
Danish expatriate men's footballers
Brønshøj Boldklub players
Kansas City Attack players
Major Indoor Soccer League (1978–1992) coaches
Major Indoor Soccer League (1978–1992) players
National Professional Soccer League (1984–2001) coaches
National Professional Soccer League (1984–2001) players
North American Soccer League (1968–1984) players
Tulsa Roughnecks (1978–1984) players
Wichita Wings (MISL) players
Wichita Wings (NPSL) players
Footballers from Copenhagen
Association football defenders
Major Arena Soccer League coaches
Danish football managers
Danish emigrants to the United States
Danish expatriate sportspeople in the United States
Expatriate soccer players in the United States